Kosovo and Russia do not have official relations due to Russia's support for Serbia in the Kosovo issue. However, the relationship between the two nations has been relatively cold, although relations have been warming in recent years.

History

Following the 2008 Kosovo declaration of independence, Russia immediately took a pro-Serbian stance, and strongly opposed to the independence of Kosovo. Opposition against Kosovo's independence since then have been remained even after the end of Vladimir Putin's first term as Russian President.

On 19 February 2009, in response to Hashim Thaçi's information that Russia is planning the recognition of Kosovo. The Minister Lavrov responded on the following day by saying "I think Mr. Thaci is indulging in wishful thinking... Mr. Thaci is the last person to make statements on behalf of the Russian Federation" and that "When discussing the problem of Kosovo, the Russian side confirms that our position remains the same and supports the settlement of this problem in accordance with Security Council Resolution 1244. Our support for Serbia's course of action in defending its sovereignty and territorial integrity also stays firm".

Russian ambassador to Serbia Aleksandr Konuzin told a Belgrade daily in June 2009 that "Russia's stand is rather simple — we are ready to back whatever position Serbia takes (with regards to Kosovo)." Russia has maintained its critical anti-Kosovo independence stance as for 2010s and continue to see it illegal.

In March 2014, Russia used Kosovo's declaration of independence as a justification for recognizing the independence of Crimea, citing the so-called "Kosovo independence precedent".

The poor relations between two have impacted on the UEFA Women's Euro 2021 qualifying, when Russia women's national football team and Kosovo women's national football team could not meet due to security reasons, and have to play in a selected neutral ground.

Cultural ties
Given that Kosovo has been imposed by the NATO forces, that it has never had any credible or stable political orientations except pushing for constant and deliberate clashes with Belgrade and local Serbian populations and that it has very limited international recognition outside NATO circles, Russia does not see itself obliged to consider it as a "sovereign state" especially since it never made any efforts to stabilize or improve its relationships with its mother state. There has therefore been no official relationship between Russia and the provincial state. Meanwhile, some limited cultural endeavours have started to be witnessed.

Russia had agreed to allow Kosovo to participate in the 2014 World Judo Championships hosted in Chelyabinsk, in this competition, Kosovo-born Majlinda Kelmendi won Kosovo's historic gold medal in the competition. She later managed to repeat the feat, once again in Russia during the 2016 European Judo Championships, this time in Kazan, which has been greeted with joy by many Albanians as a diplomatic victory toward Russia's open opposition to Kosovo's independence.

Other than judo, Russia also permitted Kosovo to participate in the 2015 World Aquatics Championships, which was considered as an exception.

In 2020 UEFA European Under-19 Championship qualification, the under-19 teams of Russia and Kosovo met for the first time in their opening game as the UEFA had accepted Kosovo among its members only in 2016. In this context, the game involved a UEFA member-team against another member-team, not recognition its proper terms. The game ended 1–1. This however, does not involve Russia's governments

Era Istrefi, a Kosmet-born singer, was permitted to perform the song Live It Up in the 2018 FIFA World Cup held in Russia, was another sign of the increase of cultural ties between two states.

In September 2020, Serbia and Kosovo agreed for economic normalisation with Donald Trump brokering. Russia also welcomed the normalisation between two states, signalling another thaw in problematic Kosovan–Russian relations.

See also
 Foreign relations of Kosovo
 Foreign relations of Russia
 Russia–Serbia relations

References

 
Russia
Bilateral relations of Russia